Victoria Cisneros (born April 17, 1985 in Albuquerque, New Mexico) is a female American boxer, who has fought six former or present World Champions in her career. She has 3 brothers, a twin sister and an older sister.

Career
In her pro boxing career, she has fought some of the world's best boxers, such as Holly Holm, Mikaela Laurén, Melissa Hernández, Layla McCarter, Chevelle Hallback and Cecilia Brækhus.

She got the opportunity to fight Holly Holm, when Melissa Hernández and her team decided to pull out of the fight on December 4, 2009.

Professional boxing record

References

External links
 
 Victoria Cisneros biography

1985 births
Living people
American women boxers
Boxers from Albuquerque, New Mexico
Lightweight boxers
21st-century American women